"Turya class" is the NATO reporting name for a class of hydrofoil torpedo boats built for the Soviet Navy and Soviet allies. The Soviet designation was Project 206M.

Design

A hydroplane was added forward to increase speed. These boats can operate at 40 knots at sea state 4 and 35 knots at sea state 5. A heavier twin 57 mm gun was added aft in response to NATO fast attack craft being fitted with the 76 mm OTO Melara gun. The boats are fitted with a helicopter type dipping sonar aft. The 533mm (21 inch) torpedo tubes can fire either anti-ship or anti-submarine torpedoes. Export boats were not fitted with dipping sonar.

Ships

Soviet Navy
30 (29 in some sources) boats were built for the Soviet Navy between 1972 and 1976. The Builders were at Kolpino and the Ulis yard in Vladivostok. Three boats remain in service with the Russian Navy.

Caspian Flotilla - 3 boats

Two boats were transferred to the Latvian Navy.

Export
  - 2 boats
 : Cuban Navy - 9 boats (1979–1983)
  - 2 boats (1985-1996)
  - 1 boat (1986–1995)
 : Vietnamese People's Navy - 5 boats

See also
List of ships of the Soviet Navy
List of ships of Russia by project number

References

Notes

Bibliography
 Also published as

External links
Project 206M Shtorm hydrofoil torpedo boats  
Complete Ship List of all Turya class torpedo boats

Torpedo boats of the Soviet Navy
Torpedo boat classes
Hydrofoils